Teter Creek Lake Wildlife Management Area is located about  northeast of Belington in Barbour County, West Virginia.

Hunting and fishing

Hunting opportunities in Teter Creek Lake WMA include deer,  grouse, raccoon, squirrel, turkey and waterfowl. Hunting opportunities are limited by the small size of the WMA.

Fishing opportunities on the  Teter Creek Lake include largemouth bass, bluegill, channel catfish, tiger musky, and stocked trout.  Only electric-powered motors are allowed on boats on Teter Creek Lake.

Rustic camping is available with 20 sites for tents or trailers at the WMA. A boat ramp and handicapped fishing trail are provided at the WMA.

See also

Animal conservation
Hunting
fishing
List of West Virginia wildlife management areas

References

External links
West Virginia DNR District 1 Wildlife Management Areas
West Virginia Hunting Regulations
West Virginia Fishing Regulations
WVDNR map of Teter Creek Lake Wildlife Management Area

Wildlife management areas of West Virginia
Protected areas of Barbour County, West Virginia
IUCN Category V